Kanakur is a village in Dharwad district of Karnataka, India.

Demographics 
As of the 2011 Census of India there were 157 households in Kanakur and a total population of 855 consisting of 434 males and 421 females. There were 96 children ages 0-6.

References

Villages in Dharwad district